General elections were held in Uruguay on 24 November 1946, alongside a constitutional referendum. The result was a victory for the Colorado Party, which won the most seats in the Chamber of Deputies and received the most votes in the presidential election, in which the Tomás Berreta faction emerged as the largest. Berreta subsequently became President on 1 March 1947.

Results

President

Results

Chamber of Deputies

Senate

References

External links
Politics Data Bank at the Social Sciences School – Universidad de la República (Uruguay)

Elections in Uruguay
Uruguay
General
Uruguay
Election and referendum articles with incomplete results